Francois Henning (born December 22, 1974), better known by his stage name Snotkop (and previously known as Lekgoa , is a South African singer and rapper of Afrikaans.

He started his music career at age 15 preparing demo CDs, and in the late 1990s adopted the stage name Lekgoa ("white guy" in Sotho) singing in the South African kwaito genre of music. In this period, he was signed to Gallo record label, releasing two albums; Basetsana in 1999 and Ngamla Yoba in 2002.

In 2005 he adopted the name Snotkop initially as part of a 4-piece boy band, and shortly later a solo act signing with Next Music-record label, and launched his self-titled 2005 debut album Snotkop followed by So Damn Sexy in 2008 and Francois Henning Was Hier in 2009. With the release of Ek Laaik Van Jol in 2012, he became one of the top selling South African artists in Africa in the Afrikaans language. Well known singles and music video releases include "Song Vir My Dad", "Dis 'n Land", "Hou My Stywer Vas", "Oppas", "Katrien", "Parapapa" a remake of Cidinho & Doca hit "Rap das Armas", "Ek Laaik Van Jol", "Hoe Lykit", "Raak Vir My Rustig", "Cool Soos Koos Kombuis" and "Agter Op My Fiets". He is also featured in Shine4's hit "Ramaja", a cover of Glennys Lynne's hit with the same title,  in Kurt Darren's hit "Stoomtrein" and in MoniQue's hit "Ek Val Vir Jou", an Afrikaans cover of Waldo's People's "Lose Control", one of several international hits he has covered in the language. Other covers include The Offspring's "Why Don't You Get A Job?", covered as "Kry Jouself By Die Werk" and Junior e Leonardo's "Rap das Armas", covered as "Parapapa", but with unrelated lyrics.

Snotkop is also a television personality. He presented the programme Petrolkop on MK, the mostly Afrikaans music channel in South Africa where Snotkop featured various celebrities driving racing cars in time trials against each other.

Awards
Snotkop was nominated for 9 MK, Tempo and Vonk awards, notably "Best Afrikaans Pop album". In 2009, he was nominated for South African Music Awards in the category "Best Afrikaans DVD" during the 15th annual awards.

In 2012, Snotkop won "Best Sokkie Dans Album" award for his album Ek Laaik Van Jol during the 18th South African Music Awards.

Discography

Studio albums
as Lekgoa
1999: Basetsana
2002: Ngamla Yoba

as Snotkop
2005: Snotkop
2008: So Damn Sexy
2009: Francois Henning Was Hier
2011: Ek Laaik van jol!
2012: Oppas
2014: Soos 'n boss
2016: HKGK
2018: Sous

Others
2007: Spring Lewendig (Live album and DVD)
2011: Die Beste Van Snotkop (Compilation album)
2013: ''Wille Videos" (DVD)

Videography
2009: "Parapapa"
2010: "Vrydagaand"
2011: "Song Vir My Dad"
2011: "Ek Laaik Van Jol"
2012: "Dis 'n Land"
2012: "Oppas"
2013: "Ek's Dalk 'n Ses"
2013: "Shut Up en Soen My"
2013: "Hou Stywer Vas"
2013: "Katrien"
2013: "Bakgat Boogie"
2014: "Dikkelicious"
2014: "Agter Op My Fiets"
2015: "Kry Jouself By Die Werk"
2015: "Ek Wens"
2015: "Hiekies in Hartenbos"
2015: "Loslap"
2016: "Cool Soos Koos Kombuis"
2016: "Rock My Amadeus"
2017: "Raak Vir My Rustig"
2017: "Woestersous"
2019: "Pens En Pootjies"

Collaborative
2010: "Ek val vir jou" (MoniQue & Snotkop)
2012: "Stoomtrein" (Kurt Darren feat. Snotkop)

References

External links
Official website
Facebook

1970s births
South African rappers
21st-century South African male singers
Afrikaans-language singers
Living people